The Guyana Football Federation is the governing body of football in Guyana. It controls the Guyana national football team. The GFF has sanctioned the Elite League as the highest tier of football in the country.

Staff

References

External links
 Guyana at the FIFA website
 Guyana at CONCACAF site

CONCACAF member associations
Football in Guyana
Association football governing bodies in South America
Sports organizations established in 1902
1902 establishments in British Guiana
Football